Eden Nachmani (born 31 October 1990) is an Israeli footballer. He plays as a forward for Ihud Bnei Majd al-Krum.

Club career

Beitar Jerusalem
Nachmani made his debut appearance with Beitar Jerusalem on 21 August 2010, coming on as a substitute in the 77th minute, after the team were losing by 3 goals.

Nachmani scored his debut goal for Beitar Jerusalem in the Toto Cup, beating Hapoel Rishon LeZion 1–0 on 14 August 2011.

Hapoel Jerusalem
On 15 August 2012, Nachmani signed a loan contract for a season with Hapoel Jerusalem. By the end of the month, Nachmani made his debut appearance with Hapoel Jerusalem, playing 69 minutes of a 1–1 draw against Hapoel Bnei Lod in Israel's second-tier league. Five months later, he scored his debut goal in senior football, in a 3–1 loss to Hapoel Nazareth Illit.

Sektzia Ness Ziona
In January 2014, following a lot of purchases by Beitar Jerusalem to strengthen the team, Nachmani signed on loan with Sektzia Ness Ziona.

Career statistics

As of 13 September 2014

References

External links
 
 Profile page at Beitar Jerusalem's official site 
 

1990 births
Living people
Israeli footballers
Beitar Jerusalem F.C. players
Hapoel Jerusalem F.C. players
Sektzia Ness Ziona F.C. players
Hapoel Hod HaSharon F.C. players
Ihud Bnei Majd al-Krum F.C. players
Association football forwards
Israeli Premier League players
Liga Leumit players
Israeli people of Moroccan-Jewish descent
Footballers from Jerusalem